Loveholics (Hangul: 러브홀릭스; previously known as Loveholic (Hangul: 러브홀릭)) was a South Korean modern rock group founded in April 2002 who released their first album in 2003.
The band successfully released six albums, including a short compilation album and a reissue of the original album with additional tracks before separating. The band is well known for their success, beginning with their first album and the success of its pop song, "놀러와 (Come On)", and the cover of member Kang Hyun-min's song, "인형의 꿈 (Doll's Dream)" as well as having its songs featured in many films. The band's song "신기루 (Mirage)" also was used as the ending theme to the Japanese anime, Black Blood Brothers soon after the song's album release. They have participated in many soundtracks for MBC and KBS.

After Ji-sun's departure, the remaining duo renamed the band Loveholics and featured guest vocals to supplement the band's sound up until disbandment.

Members
Kang Hyun-min (born September 15, 1969) made his debut as a pop musician by winning the silver prize at the 3rd Yoo Jae-ha Music Contest. Kang Hyun-min was once a member of the defunct male duo Ilgiyebo (meaning "weather forecast"). In 2001, he released his own solo album. He has produced music for many artists including; The The, Park Hye-kyung, Shin Hyo-beom, Lee Moon-se, Suh Young-eun, K2, Park Ki-young, Sung Si-kyung and Yim Hyoung-joo. He has been working in various fields of the pop music industry also creating music for various films like Christmas in August, A Pure Love Story and The Wonderful Days. Beside Jisun, he is the second most featured lead vocalist for Loveholic.

Lee Jae-hak (born December 31, 1971) is a veteran songwriter who used to be a member of a band called The Elephant. He is one of the principal lyricists for the Loveholics and he is the composer and lyricist of the band's eponymous song, "Loveholic". He also composed most of the songs on the soundtrack for the 2009 film Take Off.

Hwang Ji-sun (born October 23, 1979), who had been singing at Hongdae clubs was auditioned by Kang Hyun-min and Lee Jae-hak who had wanted to start a band.
Jisun left Loveholic in 2007. Reasons for the split were vague but it was clear that the paths that both Jisun and the rest of the group wanted to go down differed. She was later signed up by Woollim Entertainment, and her solo album was released in February 2009.

Discography

Studio albums

Special albums

Soundtrack appearances

Solo works

Jisun

Studio albums

Extended plays

Single albums

Awards

Mnet Asian Music Awards

SBS 가요대전 Gayo Awards

References

External links
  
 Fluxus Music Official Site 

South Korean indie rock groups
South Korean co-ed groups
Korean Music Award winners
Musical groups established in 2002